Amaleh Seyf (also Romanized as ‘Amaleh Seyf; also known as ‘Amaleh and Shahīd Dānesh) is a village in Ben Moala Rural District, in the Central District of Shush County, Khuzestan Province, Iran. At the 2006 census, its population was 3,535, in 707 families.

References 

Populated places in Shush County